Cunderdin Airport  is located at Cunderdin, Western Australia.

Proposed redevelopment 
In February 2017, Western Australia-based Ascent Aviation proposed a $200 million redevelopment of Cunderdin Airport, initially to be used as a diversion airport for Perth Airport, and in the future host a pilot training college and facilities to handle cargo freighters. The proposed redevelopment would see the construction of a 2600m runway with full international landing aids and space for four A380-sized aircraft. It has been proposed as a diversion airport for Perth Airport due to it being approximately fifteen minutes' flying time; not being affected by the same weather that would cause a diversion from Perth Airport; and the cost-benefit to airlines of having a closer diversion airfield. In February 2018, it was proposed that Kalgoorlie-Boulder Airport would be a better alternative than Cunderdin.

See also
 List of airports in Western Australia
 Aviation transport in Australia

References

External links
 Airservices Aerodromes & Procedure Charts

Airports in Western Australia